is a Japanese manga series by Karakara-Kemuri. The manga was serialized by Mag Garden on Monthly Comic Avarus magazine. The series has been adapted into an anime television series by Doga Kobo. The story follows Tenka Kumō, Soramaru Kumō and Chūtarō Kumō, three well-known samurai brothers who send criminals to the secluded prison Gokumonjo in the middle of Lake Biwa. However, the Kumō brothers soon learn how they are tied to the Orochi's vessel, a human host possessed by a demon serpent from ancient times, and how they are destined to destroy it once and for all. The anime has been licensed for North American release by Funimation.

A sequel manga series entitled Laughing Under the Clouds Gaiden (Donten ni Warau Gaiden) premiered in 2014 and ended on 2017. A prequel manga series titled Laughing in Limbo (Rengoku ni Warau) which is set 300 years before the original series premiered in 2014. An anime theatrical film trilogy adaptation of Laughing Under the Clouds Gaiden by Wit Studio was announced, with each part running for 60 minutes and the first part scheduled for release on December 2, 2017. A live-action film adaptation was scheduled for release on March 21, 2018.

Story
In 1868, the Meiji Restoration occurred. Because of this, the country faced many criminals, such as samurai rebelling against their fallen positions. Many were arrested, but they soon broke out of their jail cells and rampaged across Japan. Therefore, the government did their best to prevent this by building a giant prison in the middle of Lake Biwa. However, to get these criminals to the prison, they needed a form of transport. In this way, the Kumō brothers were given the responsibility to take these criminals to their final resting place.

Characters

Main characters

Played by: Sota Fukushi
Tenka is the eldest of the three Kumō brothers, as well as the 14th head of the shrine. He is both the father and mother figure to his younger brothers after the death of their parents. When in combat, Tenka is known to be strong enough to defeat dozens of prisoners in an instant with nothing but a fan, as well as being quick on his feet. He refuses to let his siblings take part in any battles, always rescuing them from dangerous situations. He shows symptoms of being the Orochi's vessel, and is promptly prosecuted without a trial, but is later revealed to be alive under the protection of the police. After fighting against the Orochi and Fuma ninjas (including Shirasu and his younger brother), he sustained wounds that left him requiring a wheelchair, unable to walk again.

Played by: Yuma Nakayama
Soramaru is the second eldest of the Kumō family. His elder brother, Tenka, entrusted him with the family's twin swords, which he practices with every day. Even throughout combat and practice, the swords remained in their sheath. Soramaru also struggles with the fact that he is weaker than Tenka, not being able to be recognized as a strong man who is worthy of protecting his household. He suffers from memory loss due to the childhood trauma of witnessing his parents' murder and nearly being strangled to death. This experience also causes him to develop an extreme aversion to having his neck touched. After Tenka's alleged death, Chūtarō's disappearance and Shirasu's betrayal, Soramaru's negative feelings causes his mental state to deteriorate and he eventually turns into the real vessel of the Orochi. Later, with Nishiki, Chūtarō and Tenka's help, Orochi is separated from Soramaru, with Abe no Sōsei's katana, and Chūtarō and Takeda's help, kills the Orochi once for all.

Played by: Kirato Wakayama
The youngest of the family, Chūtarō is the fastest of the brothers when it comes to speed. He also has a friendly relationship with the shrine's tanuki named Gerokichi. After learning that Tenka was actually not the real Orochi's vessel and has died for nothing, he decides to seek revenge and leaves the Kumō Shrine with Naoto Kagami. Later, he discovers that Tenka is still alive, and reforms his way. He cooperates with Soramaru and Takeda in the finishing blow to kill Orochi.

Played by: Renn Kiriyama
Kinjō is a freeloader at the Kumō Shrine. Because of this, he does a lot of the household chores, such as serving tea to guests. He is also one of the last remaining members of the Fuma clan, known as ninjas that were independent of master or money, loyal only to themselves. Kinjō was rescued by Tenka and is now his close friend. It is later revealed that his true that identity is the 10th head of the Fuma clan, Kotarō Fūma, and that his real objective has always been to resurrect the Orochi. He and his younger twin brother faked the Fuma massacre then separated ten years ago in order to lie low and prepare for the return of the Orochi. The younger brother was planted within Gokumonjo to gather support, while the elder brother joined the Kumō family to protect the Orochi's vessel. He was also responsible for the murder of the Kumō brothers' parents. "Shirasu Kinjō" is only an alias given to him by the Kumōs and means nothing to him. Later, when the Orochi is killed, he is confronted by the Kumō siblings, but prefers to commit suicide by jumping off a cliff. In Gaiden, it is revealed that he survived the fall and has rejoined the Fuma clan, but still has feelings of fondness for the brothers.

Botan, out of an initially unknown motive, has joined forces with Tenka in search of the Orochi's vessel. She first appears to be Chūtarō's schoolteacher, but is later revealed to be a Shikigami that played an important role in the sealing of the Orochi during its last awakening three hundred years ago. Later, when Orochi resurrects in his full form (separated from Soramaru) she is about to be destroyed when Hirari remembers and saves her.

Hirari is a one-armed police officer who often dreams of an unknown but beautiful woman. The woman is later revealed to be Botan, and the reason behind his inexplicable dreams is because he is the reincarnation of a man whose fate has been tightly intertwined with hers. At midst Orochi's awakening, Hirari remembers all about Botan and confesses his long lost love for her.

Nishiki first appears as a prison guard in Gokumonjo. She is later revealed as one of the last remaining members of the Fuma clan. However, she is not considered a pure and full-fledged Fuma as she has not completed the coming-of-age ceremony. This accounts for her unusual appearance of having only one purple eye and half of her hair being white. She has developed feelings for Soramaru and is very protective over him.

Yamainu (Orochi Extermination Squad)

Played by: Yuki Furukawa
Captain to the Yamainu Squad, he is skilled at hitting the enemies vital points to knock them out. He used to be very good friends with Tenka before the latter's desertion. He becomes Soramaru's teacher to help him to be stronger, and reconciles with Tenka during the Orochi's revival.

Member of the Yamainu Squad, she is skilled at using two revolvers to fight. She is Tenka and Sōsei's childhood friend since the start of the Yamainu Squad, and she is the moderator between her friends' conflicts.

Played by: Shunsuke Daito
Vice-captain to the Yamainu Squad, he is skilled using a big broadsword in combat. He is the teacher of Takeda (a novice in the Yamainu Squad) in combat.

Member of the Yamainu Squad, his speciality is using magic and sorcery, including summoning Shikigamis as familiar to gain information.

Played by: Masaki Kaji
Member of the Yamainu Squad, his specialty is fighting with his bare hands.

The oldest member of the Yamainu Squad, his specialty is fighting with claws.

Played by: Tomohiro Ichikawa
The newest member of the Yamainu Squad, he fights using a Katana. He is Takamine's disciple and Soramaru's rival/friend, and he gets easily jealous when Nishiki is near to Soramaru.

Other characters

A fisherman who is known as "a maniac who kills government officials without hesitation, striking down those who oppose his way." He uses a special sword that comes out of both his sleeves in the form of several blades attached to each other. He later escapes from Gokumonjo and lures Chūtarō away from the Kumō Shrine, promising him vengeance. During the Orochi's revival, he is saved by Chūtarō when a tree was about to stamp him, and, as in return, helps Chūtarō (from the shadows) saving him from a Fuma ninja.

He is Shirasu's younger twin brother with the same name, therefore, his "shadow". The remarkable differences between him and his brother are longer hair worn in a ponytail, wearing a fox mask that hides a grievous scar on the right side of his face. He was a prisoner in Gokumonjo prison, where he gets all personnel and prisoners at his favor by providing them opium. He joins his brother to awaken Orochi, but eventually their plans are frustrated by the Kumō siblings and Yamainu's progress. He sacrifices himself trying to kill Tenka and Sōsei in Orochi's beam, but is the only one to die, with Tenka and Sōsei sustaining grievous burns.

He is the father of Tenka, Soramaru and Chūtarō and was the one who founded the Yamainu Squad and worked as its instructor.
Taiko was not a Kumō by birth, but a son-in-law adopted into the family by marrying with Koyuki, his wife. Eleven years ago prior to the beginning of the series, he and Koyuki were assassinated by a masked Fuma, later revealed to be Kotaro Fuma (aka Shirasu Kinjō).

He was the head of the Kumō family from 600 years ago prior to the series who, along with Abe no Hirari, helped Botan to seal the Orochi. He used the Kumō Ceremonial Swords as his main weapon, which Soramaru wields in the future. He also has Gerokichi as his tanuki familiar, which Chūtarō befriends in the future.

A police officer who works alongside Tsuchiya.

A police officer who works alongside Kitamura.

Media

Manga
The manga series was serialized by Mag Garden on their Monthly Comic Avarus magazine. The manga series has been licensed in North America by Tokyopop.

A sequel manga series entitled Laughing Under the Clouds Gaiden (Donten ni Warau Gaiden) premiered in 2014 and ended on 2017. A prequel manga series titled Laughing in Limbo (Rengoku ni Warau) which is set 300 years before the original series premiered in 2014.

Anime
The series uses three pieces of theme song: two opening themes and one ending theme. "Biran no Kaze" (毘藍ノ風, Purifying Wind) by Ryūji Aoki is used as the opening theme for the first 6 episodes while "Ruten no Hi" (流転ノ陽, Recurrent Sun) also by Ryūji Aoki is used as the second opening theme from episode 8 onwards. The ending theme is "Attitude to Life" by Galneryus.

Episode list

References

External links

Official manga website 
Official anime website 

2014 comics endings
2014 Japanese television series endings
2017 anime films
Anime series based on manga
Doga Kobo
Funimation
IG Port franchises
Live-action films based on manga
Mag Garden manga
Manga adapted into films
Nippon TV original programming
Shōjo manga
Shōnen manga
Supernatural anime and manga
Tokyopop titles
Wit Studio
Japanese supernatural films